Chatham Sound is a sound on the North Coast of British Columbia, Canada, bordering on Alaska, United States. It is located between the Dundas and Stephens Islands and the Tsimpsean Peninsula, it is part of the Inside Passage and extends from Portland Inlet in the north to Porcher Island in the south. 

The sound can be divided into two parts, by a line drawn between Tugwell and Melville Islands. The northern part, is influenced by the Nass River outflows and village of Lax Kw'alaams, and the southern part influenced by the Skeena River outflows and the city of Prince Rupert.

It may have been named in 1788 by British Captain Charles Duncan after John Pitt, 2nd Earl of Chatham, who was First Lord of the Admiralty at that time.

Geography
It is connected to the open waters of the Hecate Strait and Dixon Entrance via several channels, such as Main, Brown, Hudson Bay, and Edye Passages. Along its southern end, the sound provides access to inland passages such as the Marcus and Arthur Passages, and the Grenville Channel beyond that.

The two major rivers that drain into the sound are the Nass River (via the Portland Inlet) and Skeena River (via the Inverness and Marcus Passages). Because of the large inflow of fresh water the salinity of the sound is lower than the adjacent ocean.

Hydrography

Chatham Sound is characterized by lower salinity near-surface waters on its eastern side, transitioning to higher salinity near-surface waters on the western side.

Currents are proportionately strong, and highly variable due to a combination of large tidal ranges, seasonally strong winds, and large peak freshwater discharges from the Skeena and Nass Rivers.

Ecology 
As a result of tidal mixing, Chatham Sound is an area of particularly high primary productivity and highly concentrated phytoplankton biomass. 
The sound has the largest diversity of shrimp species in the Pacific North Coast Integrated Management Area, with numbers dominated by humpback shrimp.
There are also major aggregations of Dungeness crab in the area.

Once thought to be extinct, sponge reefs are now known to be a significant component of the sound floor. The largest cluster is now designated the Chatham Sound Reef Complex.

See also
Chatham Strait - nearby strait in the Alaska Panhandle, named after the first Earl of Chatham

References

External links

Sounds of British Columbia
North Coast of British Columbia